Anna Vladimirovna Shorina (August 26, 1982, Moscow, USSR) is a Russian synchro-swimmer.

She has Olympic gold medal in team competition in 2004, won World (2001, 2003, 2005, 2007) and European (1999, 2000, 2002, 2004, 2006) Championships and other tournaments.

She is a member of National team since 1999, Now She Works in FC Terek Grozny.

Notes 
 
 Yahoo! Anna Shorina
  Anna Shorina

Living people
Russian synchronized swimmers
Olympic synchronized swimmers of Russia
Synchronized swimmers at the 2004 Summer Olympics
Synchronized swimmers at the 2008 Summer Olympics
Olympic gold medalists for Russia
1982 births
Swimmers from Moscow
Olympic medalists in synchronized swimming
Medalists at the 2008 Summer Olympics
Medalists at the 2004 Summer Olympics